Lake Lubāns is the largest lake in Latvia (in Latvian: Lubāns, Lubānas ezers or Lubāna ezers).

The lake lies in the center of the Eastern Latvian Lowland. It is a shallow drainage lake, fed by the Rēzekne, Malta, Malmuta and Lisiņa rivers and several smaller brooks, with an outflow via the Aiviekste River into the Daugava River.

After damaging spring floods in 1926, several dams and ditches were constructed. The elevation of the lake is allowed to fluctuate between approximately 90 and 93 metres above sea level. At an elevation of 90.75 m the lake has an area of 25 km², increasing to about 100 km² at 92.75 m. In that state it is considered to be the biggest lake in Latvia.

Other small former lakes within the Lubanas basin have been artificially drained and the land is used for agriculture.

References

External links
Geological details

Lubans
LLubans